EUwarn (proper spelling: EUWARN) – also KATWARN international – is a European warning and information system according to Article 110 EU Directive (EU) 2018/1972.

EUwarn / Katwarn-international is used by the European Commission in Brussels and Luxembourg and by the Austrian Federal Ministry of the Interior to inform affected target groups via smartphone app in dangerous situations (e.g., major fires, power outages, terrorist attacks, or pandemics).

The system is technically based on the KATWARN warning system, which has been in use in Germany since 2011, and is networked through roaming technology.

Functionality

Receiving alerts (multi-channel technology) 
In order to disseminate warnings to internal and external target groups, EUwarn uses digitally networked communication channels (EUwarn app, on-board computers, smarthome, wearables, displays, portals, etc.) – so-called "multi-channel." The EUwarn system is a multi-channel system.

In addition, the system can be used to communicate via different channels in order to best reach target groups (local and area warnings, group and authority warnings, topic and info channels).

Since EUwarn is based on Katwarn technology, which is widely used in Germany, and is roaming-enabled, the Katwarn app can also be used to receive EUwarn alerts.

Issuing Warnings (multi-hazard technology) 
Through the use of international standards (e.g. CAP - common alerting protocol) and a secure editorial and administration platform, control centers and security centers as well as external information systems (e.g. for severe weather, floods, earthquakes, "predictive policing") can be connected to the system – so-called "multi-hazard".

Warnings and warning channels can be created and sent via the editorial and administration platform, and comprehensive administrative actions can be carried out (language selection, event and area configurations, etc.).

Multilingualism 
EUwarn is multi-language capable, i.e. depending on the system settings of the smartphone, the app displays warnings in the respective language or – as default – in English. Templates for different languages can be prepared and, if necessary, automatically activated.

Technology 
Developed by of the Fraunhofer Society, EUwarn is subject to constant further development in exchange with authorities, security organizations and industry. In doing so, the principles of "privacy by design" and "privacy by default" as well as the requirements of the General Data Protection Regulation (GDPR) are followed consistently.

The EUwarn system, like the Katwarn system, is based on a microservice infrastructure. This exists decentralized on several servers and thus allows for a fast and reliable distribution of warnings.

Warnings are primarily distributed via the smartphone-app, but email and SMS can be used as additional warning channels.

Tsunami drill 
The European Commission's evaluation of a tsunami drill on the island of Kos shows that Katwarn-international is crucial for quickly warning those affected. During the 2019 drill, Katwarn-international was the only warning app used, along with other warning channels such as sirens, scoreboards and loudspeakers.

On November 21, 2019, the European Commission's Joint Research Centre (JRC) tested technology and procedures from the EU Tsunami Last Mile project. During the drill, EUwarn (or Katwarn-international) was used to send a tsunami warning to the participants and give them instructions on how to evacuate. The evaluation showed that a complete dissemination of the warning message was only possible by using Katwarn. For example, since sirens could not be heard in classrooms, the only way to reach a school class was through the Katwarn app on a teacher's smartphone.

References 

Warning systems